Monee is a village in Will County, Illinois, United States, a south suburb of Chicago. The population was 5,128 at the 2020 census.

History
The village is named for Marie LeFevre Bailly, the wife of fur trader Joseph Bailly, "Monee" being an indigenous-accented pronunciation of "Marie."

Monee was "on the north edge" of the Cyclone of 1917, which damaged trees and structures. Monee's lumberyard supplied materials to rebuild the 67 structures in neighboring Green Garden and Monee Township.

Geography

Demographics

As of the census of 2000, there were 2,939 people, 1,204 households, and 872 families residing in the village. The racial makeup of the village was 93.88% White, 2.12% African American, 0.07% Native American, 0.44% Asian, 1.88% from other races, and 1.61% from two or more races. Hispanic or Latino of any race were 4.04% of the population.

There were 1,204 households, out of which 26.5% had children under the age of 18 living with them, 63.4% were married couples living together, 6.3% had a female householder with no husband present, and 27.5% were non-families. 21.9% of all households were made up of individuals, and 8.7% had someone living alone who was 65 years of age or older. The average household size was 2.43 and the average family size was 2.83.

In the village, the population was spread out, with 21.5% under the age of 18, 6.2% from 18 to 24, 34.6% from 25 to 44, 22.1% from 45 to 64, and 15.6% who were 65 years of age or older. The median age was 37 years. For every 100 females, there were 101.4 males. For every 100 females age 18 and over, there were 99.7 males.

The median income for a household in the village was $58,625, and the median income for a family was $64,960. Males had a median income of $46,604 versus $33,750 for females. The per capita income for the village was $27,687. About 2.7% of families and 3.4% of the population were below the poverty line, including 3.9% of those under age 18 and 4.7% of those age 65 or over.

Education

The village of Monee falls within the Crete-Monee Community Unit School District 201-U.  Monee Elementary is located in the village.

Notable people
 Tony Zych, Major League Baseball pitcher for  New York Yankees

References

External links
Monee official website

Villages in Illinois
Villages in Will County, Illinois